Sahib Singh (17 June 1663 – 7 December 1704 or 1705) was one of the Panj Pyare (or the Five beloved ones). He was formerly known as Sahib Chand and was born into the Nai caste (also transliterated as Naee) before being baptized into Khalsa tradition.

Birth and Family
There are different versions of different scholars regarding Birth Place and Family Members of Sahib Singh. Though all accepts the fact that, he was born in family of Barbers.

Regarding birthplace:
 The most popular and acceptable belief is that he was born in Bidar in present-day Karnataka.
 As per Mahankosh, Bhai Sahib Singh was born at Nangal Shaheedan in 4, Harh Samvat 1722, District Hoshiarpur. Using the European calendar, this means he was born in 1665; he died in 1705. 

Regarding father and mother name:
 As per Mahankosh, He was born to Bishan Devi and Tulsi Ram (or Charan Ram), a Barber.
 Another tradition believes that he was son of Bhai Guru Narayana (a barber of Bidar in Karnataka) and his wife

Bhai Sahib died in the battle of Chamkaur on 7 December 1705 with Bhai Himmat Singh and Bhai Mohkam Singh.

References 

Encyclopedia of Sikhism, by Harbans Singh.Published by Punjabi University, Patiala

Sikh martyrs
Sikh warriors
Military personnel from Karnataka
People from Bidar
17th-century Indian people